Drăcșenei is a commune in Teleorman County, Muntenia, Romania. It is composed of four villages: Drăcșani, Drăcșenei, Odobeasca and Satul Vechi. It included two other villages until 2004, when they were split off to form Beuca Commune.

References

Communes in Teleorman County
Localities in Muntenia